Kyle Moore-Brown (born February 26, 1971) is a former Arena Football League offensive lineman/defensive lineman for the Albany/Indiana Firebirds and the Colorado Crush. He is currently the associate head coach and offensive line coach for the Nebraska Danger of the Indoor Football League (IFL). He was the head coach of the Cedar Rapids Titans of the Indoor Football League.

High school career
While attending Central High School in Newark, New Jersey, Moore-Brown was a standout in football and track. In football, he played fullback, was an All-State pick, an All-City pick, and as a senior, he rushed for 1,300 yards, and 17 touchdowns. Moore-Brown graduated from Central High School in 1989.

College career
Moore-Brown played college football for the University of Kansas Jayhawks.

Professional career
Kyle Moore-Brown played for 2 teams in the Arena Football League: the Albany Firebirds (1995–2003), and the Colorado Crush (2004–2008).

Coaching career
After the original Arena Football League suspended operations following the 2008 season, Moore-Brown became the assistant head coach of the La Crosse Spartans, an Indoor Football League team that began play in 2010. In 2011, he became the head coach of the La Crosse Spartans when his brother Gilbert Brown stepped away from the team for personal reasons. Moore-Brown returned to the AFL in 2013 when he was named the offensive and defensive line coach for the Iowa Barnstormers. In 2014, Moore-Brown accepted the offensive line coach position with the Pittsburgh Power.

References

1971 births
Living people
Central High School (Newark, New Jersey) alumni
American football offensive linemen
American football defensive linemen
Kansas Jayhawks football players
Albany Firebirds players
Indiana Firebirds players
Colorado Crush players
Iowa Barnstormers coaches
Pittsburgh Power coaches
Indoor Football League coaches
Players of American football from Newark, New Jersey